The Balts or Baltic peoples are an ethno-linguistic group of peoples who speak the Baltic languages of the Balto-Slavic branch of the Indo-European languages.

One of the features of Baltic languages is the number of conservative or archaic features retained. Among the Baltic peoples are modern-day Lithuanians and Latvians (including Latgalians) — all Eastern Balts — as well as the Old Prussians, Yotvingians and Galindians — the Western Balts — whose languages and cultures are now extinct.

Etymology
Medieval German chronicler Adam of Bremen in the latter part of the 11th century AD was the first writer to use the term "Baltic" in reference to the sea of that name. Before him various ancient places names, such as Balcia, were used in reference to a supposed island in the Baltic Sea.

Adam, a speaker of German, connected Balt- with belt, a word with which he was familiar.

In Germanic languages there was some form of the toponym East Sea until after about the year 1600, when maps in English began to label it as the Baltic Sea. By 1840, German nobles of the Governorate of Livonia adopted the term "Balts" to distinguish themselves from Germans of Germany. They spoke an exclusive dialect, Baltic German, which was regarded by many as the language of the Balts until 1919.

In 1845, Georg Heinrich Ferdinand Nesselmann proposed a distinct language group for Latvian, Lithuanian, and Old Prussian, which he termed Baltic. The term became prevalent after Latvia and Lithuania gained independence in 1918. Up until the early 20th century, either "Latvian" or "Lithuanian" could be used to mean the entire language family.

History

Origins

The Balts or Baltic peoples, defined as speakers of one of the Baltic languages, a branch of the Indo-European language family, are descended from a group of Indo-European tribes who settled the area between the lower Vistula and southeast shore of the Baltic Sea and upper Daugava and Dnieper rivers. Because the thousands of lakes and swamps in this area contributed to the Balts' geographical isolation, the Baltic languages retain a number of conservative or archaic features.

Some of the major authorities on Balts, such as Kazimieras Būga, Max Vasmer, Vladimir Toporov and Oleg Trubachyov, in conducting etymological studies of eastern European river names, were able to identify in certain regions names of specifically Baltic provenance, which most likely indicate where the Balts lived in prehistoric times. This information is summarized and synthesized by Marija Gimbutas in The Balts (1963) to obtain a likely proto-Baltic homeland. Its borders are approximately: from a line on the Pomeranian coast eastward to include or nearly include the present-day sites of Berlin, Warsaw, Kyiv, and Kursk, northward through Moscow to the River Berzha, westward in an irregular line to the coast of the Gulf of Riga, north of Riga. However, other scholars such as Endre Bojt (1999) reject the presumption that there ever was such a thing as a clear, single "Baltic Urheimat": 'The references to the Balts at various Urheimat locations across the centuries are often of doubtful authenticity, those concerning the Balts furthest to the West are the more trustworthy among them. (...) It is wise to group the particulars of Baltic history according to the interests that moved the pens of the authors of our sources.'

Proto-history
The area of Baltic habitation shrank due to assimilation by other groups, and invasions. According to one of the theories which has gained considerable traction over the years, one of the western Baltic tribes, the Galindians, Galindae, or Goliad, migrated to the area around modern-day Moscow, Russia around the fourth century AD.

Over time the Balts became differentiated into Western and Eastern Balts. In the fifth century AD parts of the eastern Baltic coast began to be settled by the ancestors of the Western Balts: Brus/Prūsa ("Old Prussians"), Sudovians/Jotvingians, Scalvians, Nadruvians, and Curonians. The Eastern Balts, including the hypothesised Dniepr Balts, were living in modern-day Belarus, Ukraine and Russia.

Germanic peoples lived to the west of the Baltic homelands; by the first century AD, the Goths had stabilized their kingdom from the mouth of the Vistula, south to Dacia. As Roman domination collapsed in the first half of the first millennium CE in Northern and Eastern Europe, large migrations of the Balts occurred — first, the Galindae or Galindians towards the east, and later, Eastern Balts towards the west. In the eighth century, Slavic tribes from the Volga regions appeared. By the 13th and 14th centuries, they reached the general area that the present-day Balts and Belarusians inhabit. Many other Eastern and Southern Balts either assimilated with other Balts, or Slavs in the fourth–seventh centuries and were gradually slavicized.

Middle Ages

In the 12th and 13th centuries, internal struggles and invasions by Ruthenians and Poles, and later the expansion of the Teutonic Order, resulted in an almost complete annihilation of the Galindians, Curonians, and Yotvingians. Gradually, Old Prussians became Germanized or Lithuanized between the 15th and 17th centuries, especially after the Reformation in Prussia. The cultures of the Lithuanians and Latgalians/Latvians survived and became the ancestors of the populations of the modern-day countries of Latvia and Lithuania.

Old Prussian was closely related to the other extinct Western Baltic languages, Curonian, Galindian and Sudovian. It is more distantly related to the surviving Eastern Baltic languages, Lithuanian and Latvian. Compare the Prussian word seme (zemē), Latvian zeme, the Lithuanian žemė (land in English).

Culture

The Balts originally practiced Baltic religion. They were gradually Christianized as a result of the Northern Crusades of the Middle Ages. Baltic peoples such as the Latvians, Lithuanians and Old Prussians had their distinct mythologies. The Lithuanians have close historic ties to Poland, and many of them are Roman Catholic. The Latvians have close historic ties to Northern Germany and Scandinavia, and many of them are irreligious. In recent times, the Baltic religion has been revived in Baltic neopaganism.

Genetics

The Balts are included in the "North European" gene cluster together with the Germanic peoples, some Slavic groups (the Poles and Northern Russians) and Baltic Finnic peoples.

Recent genetic research show that the eastern Baltic in the Mesolithic was inhabited primarily by Western Hunter-Gatherers (WHGs). Their paternal haplogroups were mostly types of I2a and R1b, while their maternal haplogroups were mostly types of U5, U4 and U2. These people carried a high frequency of the derived HERC2 allele which codes for light eye color.

Baltic hunter-gatherers still displayed a slightly larger amount of WHG ancestry than Scandinavian Hunter-Gatherers (SHGs). WHG ancestry in the Baltic was particularly high among hunter-gatherers in Latvia and Lithuania. Unlike other parts of Europe, the hunter-gatherers of the eastern Baltic do not appear to have mixed much with Early European Farmers (EEFs) arriving from Anatolia.

During the Neolithic, increasing admixture from Eastern Hunter-Gatherers (EHGs) is detected. The paternal haplogroups of EHGs was mostly types of R1b and R1a, while their maternal haplogroups appears to have been almost exclusively types of U5, U4, and U2.

The rise of the Corded Ware culture in the eastern Baltic in the Chalcolithic and Bronze Age is accompanied by a significant infusion of steppe ancestry and EEF ancestry into the eastern Baltic gene pool. In the aftermath of the Corded Ware expansion, local hunter-gatherer ancestry experienced a resurgence.

Haplogroup N did not appear in the eastern Baltic until the late Bronze Age, perhaps as part of a westward migration of speakers of Uralic languages.

Modern-day Balts have a lower amount of EEF ancestry, and a higher amount of WHG ancestry, than any other population in Europe.

In accordance with the 2008 research results of Russian and Estonian geneticists, the Northern Russians (a subethnic group) genetically are very similar to the Balts.

List of Baltic peoples

Modern-day Baltic peoples
Eastern Baltic peoples
Latvians
Latgalians
Lithuanians
Aukštaitians ("highlanders")
Samogitians ("lowlanders")

See also

 Eastern Baltic languages
 Western Baltic languages

Notes

References

Sources

English language

Polish language

Further reading
 (in Lithuanian) E. Jovaiša, Aisčiai. Kilmė (Aestii. The Origin). Lietuvos edukologijos universiteto leidykla, Vilnius; 2013. 
 (in Lithuanian) E. Jovaiša, Aisčiai. Raida (Aestii. The Evolution). Lietuvos edukologijos universiteto leidykla, Vilnius; 2014. 
 (in Lithuanian) E. Jovaiša, Aisčiai. Lietuvių ir Lietuvos pradžia (Aestii. The Beginning of Lithuania and Lithuanians). Lietuvos edukologijos universiteto leidykla, Vilnius; 2016. 
 Nowakowski, Wojciech; Bartkiewicz, Katarzyna. "Baltes et proto-Slaves dans l'Antiquité. Textes et archéologie". In: Dialogues d'histoire ancienne, vol. 16, n°1, 1990. pp. 359–402. [DOI: https://doi.org/10.3406/dha.1990.1472];[www.persee.fr/doc/dha_0755-7256_1990_num_16_1_1472]
 Matthews, W. K. "Baltic origins." Revue des études slaves 24.1/4 (1948): 48–59.

External links
  E-book of the original.
 
 
 

 
Indo-European peoples
Modern Indo-European peoples